The 2013–14 season of Atromitos F.C. is the 91st in the club's history and the second consecutive season that the club will be participating in the UEFA Europa League. It will also be the sixth consecutive season that the club will be competing in Super League Greece.

Events

Squad changes
8 June: A termination of contract with Manolo occurs, since the player couldn't live up to the expectations of the club.
10 June: Papadopoulos signs a two-year contract with the club.
15 June: Fotis Georgiou signs a three-year contract with the club.
17 June: Chigozie Udoji leaves the club, since his contract doesn't get renewed, despite the fact that he was in the starting eleven a lot of games last season.
19 June: Socrates Fytanidis renews his contract with the club for four years.
26 June: Javier Umbides signs a two-year contract with the club.
27 June: Pitu Garcia renews his contract with the club for one more year.
30 June: Christos Arkoudas signs a one-year contract with the club.
1 July: The first training of the club for the new year took place, and every member of the club, not only the players, was sanctificated, with 1,000 fans present at the stadium.
3 July: Michalis Sifakis signs a one-year contract with the club, with an option of a one-year renewal.
7 July: Luigi Cennamo signs a one-year contract with the club, with a one-year renewal option.
8 August: Njazi Kuqi signs a mutual consent termination of his contract with the club.

Important Moments
29 August:  Atromitos achieve their first win in European matches, as well as their first away win in Europe, beating AZ Alkmaar 0–2. Unfortunately, this win was insufficient to give them the ticket for the group stage, since Atromitos had lost the first leg at home 1–3, with Alkmaar proceeding on away goals.

Club

Athletic staff

Other information

Players

Squad statistics

International Players

Transfers

Summer

In

Out

Loaned out

Competitions

Overall

Last updated: 7 March 2014

Super League Greece

League table

Results summary

Results by round

Play-offs table

Matches

Friendlies

Super League Greece

Cup

Europa League

References

2013-14
Greek football clubs 2013–14 season